The Armeno-Turkish alphabet is a version of the Armenian alphabet sometimes used to write Ottoman Turkish until 1928, when the Latin-based modern Turkish alphabet was introduced. 
The Armenian script was not just used by ethnic Armenians to write the Turkish language, but also by the non-Armenian Ottoman Turkish elite.

An American correspondent in Marash in 1864 calls the alphabet "Armeno-Turkish", describing it as consisting of 31 Armenian letters and "infinitely superior" to the Arabic or Greek alphabets for rendering Turkish.

This Armenian script was used alongside the Arabic script on official documents of the Ottoman Empire written in Ottoman Turkish. For instance, the first novel to be written in Turkish in the Ottoman Empire was  Vartan Pasha's 1851 Akabi Hikâyesi, written in the Armenian script.

Alphabet

Digraphs 
Although the Armenian alphabet fits the Turkish phonology very well, a few digraphs are needed to write all Turkish sounds, especially vowels. Some of them are also present in Armenian orthography.

References

Alphabets used by Turkic languages
Ottoman culture
Turkish language
Armenian alphabet